Somniosus gonzalezi is an extinct species of sleeper shark that lived during the Oligocene epoch Rupelian to Chattian stages. The species was described from teeth fossils found in the Pysht Formation of Washington states Olympic Peninsula.

References

Fossil taxa described in 2016
Somniosus gonzalezi
Prehistoric sharks
Fossils of the United States
Fish described in 2016